Ro-Ann Mohammed is a human rights activist. In 2012, she co-founded the organisation Barbados - Gays, Lesbians and All-Sexuals against Discrimination (B-GLAD) with Donnya Piggott. In 2018, she was an organizer of Barbados' first LGBT Pride Parade.

Early life 
Ro-Ann was born in Trinidad and Tobago. She moved to Barbados as a child, where she attended The University of the West Indies Cave Hill and Studied Psychology.

Career 
In 2012, she started B-GLAD with  Donnya Piggott. She has been vocal about the discrimination that LGBT people face in Barbados. and that the Evangelical Church in Barbados discriminates against LGBT people.

She is a feminist, advocate for gender equality and activist for sexual and reproductive health rights. In 2016, she was named as a Fellow in President Obama's Young Leader of the Americas Initiative (YLAI) for her work with the Barbados LGBT community.

She speaks out against the Barbados government, which punishes gay sex with life imprisonment. She attended anti-LGBT spaces in protest. In 2018, Mohammed was responsible for organizing Barbados' first LGBT Pride Parade, which took place in the island's capital of Bridgetown.

References 

1992 births
Living people
Barbadian LGBT rights activists
Trinidad and Tobago emigrants to Barbados